"Don't Think About Me" is a song by Swiss recording artist Luca Hänni. Serving as his coronation song from Deutschland sucht den Superstar, the uptempo pop rock song was written and produced by DSDS judge Dieter Bohlen and released as the first single from his debut studio album, My Name Is Luca (2012), on April 28, 2012 in German-speaking Europe. An instant success, it debuted atop the single charts in Austria, Germany, and Switzerland and sold more than 100,000 copies throughout its chart run.

Music video
The music video for "Don't Think About Me" was filmed on April 30, 2012 in Rømø, Denmark.

Track listings

Charts

Weekly charts

Year-end charts

Certifications

Release history

References

2012 singles
2012 songs
Songs written by Dieter Bohlen
Number-one singles in Germany
Number-one singles in Austria
Number-one singles in Switzerland
German pop songs
Luca Hänni songs
Universal Music Group singles